Karosa C 935 is an intercity bus produced by bus manufacturer Karosa from the Czech Republic, in the years 1997 to 2001. In 1999 was introduced modernised version C935E. It was succeeded by Karosa C 956 in 2002.

Construction features 
Karosa C 935 is basic model of Karosa 900 series. C 935 is derived from Karosa C 934 inter city bus, and also unified with city bus models such as B 941 and B 932. Body is semi-self-supporting with frame and engine with manual gearbox is placed in the rear part. Only rear axle is propulsed. Front axle is independent, rear axle is solid. All axles are mounted on air suspension. On the right side are two doors. Inside are used leatherette seats. Drivers cab is not separated from the rest of the vehicle.

Production and operation 
In the year 1997 started serial production, which continued until 2001. Since 1999 were buses produced only in modernised version B 935 E, which has new solid front axle Škoda-LIAZ, ABS and ASR.

Currently, number of Karosa C935 buses is decreasing, due to high age of buses.

Historical vehicles 
Any historical vehicle was not saved yet.

See also 
  Article about Karosa C 934 and C 935 operated in Prague

 List of buses

Buses manufactured by Karosa
Buses of the Czech Republic